is a female Japanese manga artist. She often participates in cosplaying events. Some of Kira Inugami's body pillows are sold online in Japan.

Works illustrated
H2O: Footprints in the Sand artbook & manga
 artbook
Ebiten: Kōritsu Ebisugawa Kōkō Tenmonbu
Seitokai no Ichizon

External links
Kira Inugami's personal website 

Manga artists
Living people
Year of birth missing (living people)